Bogart Man is an Italian-based fashion house established in 2000, founded by designer Eli Saig (born February 3, 1966), an Israeli fashion guru.

The company best-known for making fashionable garments for men.

References

External links

Clothing brands
Clothing companies established in 2000
Design companies established in 2000
African clothing